Andrés Enrique Ferro Peña (born 2 August 2001) is a Venezuelan footballer who plays as a centre-back for Venezuelan Primera División side Metropolitanos.

Club career

Metropolitanos
Ferro is a product of Metropolitanos in Caracas. He got his official debut for Metropolitanos in a Venezuelan Primera División game against Deportivo Anzoátegui on 4 August 2018, two days after his 18th birthday. He made a total of three appearances in that season.

Ferro got his breakthrough in the 2019 season, where he established himself as a key player on the team, making 21 appearances during the year. During January and February 2020, Ferro made three appearances, before he suffered a fracture in his right foot and was out for five weeks. He made a total of 16 appearances in the 2020 season.

In the 2021 season, Ferro was one of the players with who played the most minutes during the season, 1,168 minutes in 22 games.

In 2022 he played as centre-back with the Venezuelan U21 football team in the Toulon Tournament, finishing as Runners-Up, losing against France 2-1 in the finale.

Honours
Individual
Maurice Revello Tournament Best XI: 2022

Personal life
Ferro is of Italian descent from his father, but was born and raised in Venezuela.

References

External links
 

Living people
2001 births
Association football defenders
Venezuelan footballers
Venezuelan people of Italian descent
Venezuelan Primera División players
Metropolitanos FC players